In algebraic number theory, a quadratic field is an algebraic number field of degree two over , the rational numbers.

If , the corresponding quadratic field is called a real quadratic field, and, if , it is called an imaginary quadratic field or a complex quadratic field, corresponding to whether or not it is a subfield of the field of the real numbers.

Quadratic fields have been studied in great depth, initially as part of the theory of binary quadratic forms. There remain some unsolved problems. The class number problem is particularly important.

Ring of integers

Discriminant
For a nonzero square free integer , the discriminant of the quadratic field  is  if  is congruent to  modulo , and otherwise .

The set of discriminants of quadratic fields is exactly the set of fundamental discriminants.

Prime factorization into ideals
Any prime number  gives rise to an ideal  in the ring of integers  of a quadratic field . In line with general theory of splitting of prime ideals in Galois extensions, this may be

 is inert  is a prime ideal.
 The quotient ring is the finite field with  elements: .
 The quotient ring is the product .
The quotient ring contains non-zero nilpotent elements.

The third case happens if and only if  divides the discriminant . For example, if  is an odd prime not dividing , then  splits if and only if  is congruent to a square modulo . The first two cases are, in a certain sense, equally likely to occur as  runs through the primes—see Chebotarev density theorem.

The law of quadratic reciprocity implies that the splitting behaviour of a prime  in a quadratic field depends only on  modulo , where  is the field discriminant.

Class group 
Determining the class group of a quadratic field extension can be accomplished using Minkowski's bound and the Kronecker symbol because of the finiteness of the class group. A quadratic field  has discriminant

so the Minkowski bound is

This can be done by looking at the decomposition of the ideals  for  prime where  page 72 These decompositions can be found using the Dedekind–Kummer theorem.

Quadratic subfields of cyclotomic fields

The quadratic subfield of the prime cyclotomic field
A classical example of the construction of a quadratic field is to take the unique quadratic field inside the cyclotomic field generated by a primitive th root of unity, with  an odd prime number. This can also be predicted from enough ramification theory. In fact,  is the only prime that ramifies in the cyclotomic field, so  is the only prime that can divide the quadratic field discriminant.

Other cyclotomic fields
If one takes the other cyclotomic fields, they have Galois groups with extra -torsion, so contain at least three quadratic fields.  In general a quadratic field of field discriminant  can be obtained as a subfield of a cyclotomic field of th roots of unity.  This expresses the fact that the conductor of a quadratic field is the absolute value of its discriminant, a special case of the conductor-discriminant formula.

Orders of quadratic number fields of small discriminant

The following table shows some orders of small discriminant of quadratic fields. The maximal order of an algebraic number field is its ring of integers, and the discriminant of the maximal order is the discriminant of the field. The discriminant of a non-maximal order is the product of the discriminant of the corresponding maximal order by the square of the determinant of the matrix that expresses a basis of the non-maximal order over a basis of the maximal order.

For real quadratic integer rings, the ideal class number, which measures the failure of unique factorization, is given in OEIS A003649; for the imaginary case, they are given in OEIS A000924.

Some of these examples are listed in Artin, Algebra (2nd ed.), §13.8.

See also

Eisenstein–Kronecker number
Genus character
Heegner number
Infrastructure (number theory)
Quadratic integer
Quadratic irrational
Stark–Heegner theorem
Dedekind zeta function
Quadratically closed field

Notes

References
  Chapter 6.
 
 
  Chapter 3.1.

External links 

Algebraic number theory
Field (mathematics)